Mark Putnam "Putt" Choate (born December 11, 1956) is a former linebacker in the National Football League.

Biography
Choate was born on December 11, 1956 in Big Spring, Texas. Choate attended Coahoma, Texas High School before attending Southern Methodist University.

Career
Choate was signed as an undrafted free agent by the Atlanta Falcons in May 1979.  He spent the entire 1979 season on injured reserve after suffering a broken leg in training camp on August 13, 1979. He was released by the Falcons following the season and then was cut by the Houston Oilers on August 1, 1980.

After spending two years out of football, Choate was signed as a free agent by the USFL's Denver Gold on December 7, 1982. In 1983, Choate started all 18 games for the Gold and recorded a team-high 178 tackles.  He also rushed 5 times for 148 yards for 2 touchdowns - both scored on fake punts.

Prior to the 1984 campaign, Choate was surprisingly traded by the Gold to the expansion San Antonio Gunslingers on February 13, 1984 for quarterback Bob Gagliano.  Choate went on to spearhead the "Bounty Hunter" defensive unit in San Antonio starting all 18 games recording 197 tackles, 6 sacks and 2 interceptions (1 for a touchdown return). In 1985, Choate once again led the Gunslingers by starting all 18 games, making 142 tackles, one sack and one interception. The USFL folded in August 1986, however, Choate was just one of three players in USFL history to play and start in all 54 regular season games over three seasons.

After being a member of the San Antonio Gunslingers of the United States Football League, Choate played with the Green Bay Packers during the 1987 NFL season. He played at the collegiate level at Southern Methodist University.

See also
List of Green Bay Packers players

References

People from Big Spring, Texas
San Antonio Gunslingers players
Denver Gold players
Green Bay Packers players
American football linebackers
Southern Methodist University alumni
SMU Mustangs football players
1956 births
Living people